SmarTone Telecommunications Holdings Limited (0315.HK), listed in Hong Kong since 1996 and a subsidiary of Sun Hung Kai Properties Limited, is a leading telecommunications provider with operating subsidiaries in Hong Kong and Macau, offering voice, multimedia and mobile broadband services, as well as fixed fibre broadband services for both consumer and corporate markets. SmarTone spearheaded 5G development in Hong Kong since May 2020, with the launch of its territory-wide 5G services. SmarTone is also the first in Hong Kong to launch Home 5G Broadband service.

SmarTone delivers a trusted and connected experience through its high quality network, people-driven products and services combined with innovation, passion and understanding of customer needs.

SmarTone differentiates its content, excellent customer service, business and consumer products for all Hong Kong customers, allowing them to live and feel smarter everyday. This strong presence is also backed by expert technical know-how, over 30 stores across Hong Kong, its 5 core brands and its innovative business strategies arm.

History 
SmarTone was launched by Sun Hung Kai Properties and ABC Communications in 1992. It started operations in March 1993 as the first GSM network in Hong Kong and in Asia. It used to have another branding EXTRA for its GSM-1800-only packages obtained by the acquisition of P Plus Communications in March 1998. The brand EXTRA ended in 2002 and was merged into SmarTone's dual-band network.

A new branding "SmarTone-Vodafone" was officially launched in April 2005, following a partnership agreement with Vodafone in December 2004. This brand name was used only in Hong Kong. SmarTone retained its original brand name in Macau.

On 19 September 2011, SmarTone Telecommunications Holdings Limited announced that it would not renew its marketing co-operation with Vodafone and reverted its brand to SmarTone from December 2011.

In January 2018, SmarTone launched a new brand, Birdie, which is targeting millennial. Birdie has two products: the no contract local mobile plan and the travel data SIM card (simply known as Birdie Travel SIM). 

In March 2019, SmarTone pushed the frontier to 5G and pioneered Hong Kong’s first 5G live field trial in 3.5 GHz and 28 GHz bands simultaneous

On 26 May 2020, SmarTone launched its 5G service in Hong Kong, offering ultra fast 5G connectivity with the widest network coverage both indoors and outdoors.

In September 2020, Launched Hong Kong’s first Home 5G Broadband Service, offering 
5G ultra-fast speed, simple plug-and-play setup and fibrefree convenience for residential users. 

In May 2021, SmarTone unveiled ‘5G LAB’ at Sky100 Observation Deck of International Commerce Centre to showcase Hong Kong’s world-class 5G innovation and solidify its status as a global 5G leader. 

In December 2022, SmarTone announced a collaboration with The Point, an integrated loyalty programme of Sun Hung Kai Properties. SmarTone’s customers can automatically earn 1 The Point bonus point upon every eligible spending of $2 at SmarTone.

Network Development

Hong Kong

2G
 March 1993 – Launched Asia's first GSM mobile service
 December 1993 – Launched Asia's first auto-GSM roaming service
 December 2002 – Launched SmarTone iN! – Proprietary advanced multimedia services mobile portal for customers
 August  2012 – Re-farmed the 2G 1800 MHz frequency band for its 4G LTE network and put into use 
September 2014 – Announced in the 2013/2014 Annual Results Announcement that it started to re-farm its 2G 900 MHz spectrum for 4G LTE, to provide even better coverage. The re-farming targets to complete at the end of 2014 
August 2022 -  Announced to Terminate 2G Services on 14 October 2022

3G
 December 2004 – Launched 3G services
 July 2007 – Became the first company in the world to enable customers to stream flash video when browsing on any 3G feature phone
 April 2010 – Debut 28.8Mbit/s HSPA+ network
 September 2001 – Successfully bid the 3G license in Hong Kong 
 March 2011 – Won the auction for 850 MHz frequency band for its 3G service

4G 
 August 2012 – Launched its 4G service with 1800 MHz spectrum, supporting all 4G smartphones available in Hong Kong. 1800 MHz spectrum provides better indoor coverage than higher frequency spectrum  
 September 2012 – Became the only Hong Kong mobile operator approved by Apple to offer 4G on iPhone 5. SmarTone emphasized that "it is the only operator in HK offers 4G network on iPhone 5"  
 November 2012 – Extended 4G LTE coverage on all MTR Island Line stations and targets to offer 4G LTE coverage at all MTR stations and its connecting tunnels in early 2013 
 January 2013 – Provided 4G LTE network along the seven MTR lines (Island Line, Kwun Tong Line, Tsuen Wan Line, Tseng Kwan O Line, Tung Chung Line, Disney Line and the Airport Express). In the same year, it successfully bid for 2 x 10 MHz at the 2600 MHz frequency band for its 4G network to expand its network capacity and offer higher speed 
 December 2013 – Extended its 4G coverage to KCR's lines (East Rail Line, West Rail Line and Ma On Shan Line) and Lok Ma Chau Line
 August 2014 – Launched VoLTE service but only supported selected smartphone models 
 September 2014 – Commenced the re-farming of 2G 900MHZ spectrum for its 4G LTE, to provide better indoor coverage. Target to complete the re-farming end of this year. SmarTone planned to meet the growing data demand with cell densification, small cell technologies, LTE-Advanced, as well as refarming 
 October 2016 – Extended 4G coverage to the new MTR Kwun Tong Line Extension, covering the new Whampoa and Ho Man Tin stations 
 December 2016 - Extended 4.5G coverage to the new South Island Line, including Ocean Park, Wong Chuk Hang, Lei Tung and South Horizons stations and deployed additional 2100 MHz spectrum to all MTR lines

5G
 November 2016 – Partnered with Ericsson for a five-year partnership toward 5G, commencing early trials and pilot deployments of key pre-5G technologies to take place in Q4 2016 
 May 2020 - Launched its 5G service
 Sept 2020 - Launched its Home 5G Broadband Service 
 Oct 2021 - Acquired 65MHz of New Radio Spectrum Expanding Network Capacity to Support Future 5G Business Growth
 May 2022 - 5G network coverage extends to East Rail Line cross-harbour extension Optimal network experience spanning all Hong Kong MTR stations
 Dec 2022 - 5G Network covers Tseung Kwan O – Lam Tin Tunnel and Cross Bay Link

Macau

The 2G, 3G and 4G networks of SmarTone Macau were built by Nokia Networks.

2G
 July 2001 – Launched GSM mobile service in Macau
 Its market share was estimated at approximately 11% as of December 31, 2003.

3G
 July 2010 – Launched 3G service in Macau

4G
 November 2015 – Launched 4G service in Macau

Awards 
 June 2000 Distinguished Salesperson Awards, Hong Kong Management Association
 October 2001 2001 Service & Courtesy Award, Hong Kong Retail Management Association
 November 2002 Mystery Shopper Programme, Hong Kong Retail Management Association 
 November 2003 Mystery Shopper Programme, Hong Kong Retail Management Association 
 October 2004 2004 Service & Courtesy Award, Hong Kong Retail Management Association
 November 2005 Mystery Shopper Programme, Hong Kong Retail Management Association 
 November 2006 Mystery Shopper Programme, Hong Kong Retail Management Association 
 December 2007 Best Telecommunications Service Provider, Q Walker 2007, Express Post
 December 2008 Pro Choice Award - Mobile Network, Capital Weekly
 September 2009 SMBWorld Editor’s Choice - Mobile Broadband
 December 2010 Hong Kong Outstanding Enterprises 2010, Economic Digest 
 December 2011 Hong Kong Outstanding Enterprises 2011, Economic Digest
 November 2012 Top 10 - Growth in Net Profit Most Promising Award, Top 100 Hong Kong Listed Companies Selection, Finet 
 August 2013 Best Telecom Provider - Mobile Service, HKGolden IT Award 
 July 2014 Yahoo! Emotive Brand Awards 2013-14
 June 2015 26th Top Service Award 2015, Next Magazine 
 December 2016 GS1 Hong Kong Consumer Caring Company, Consumer Caring Scheme
 June 2017 eComAS Award 2017, Marketing Magazine 
 October 2018 2018 Service & Courtesy Award, Hong Kong Retail Management Association
 December 2019 2019 Service & Courtesy Award, Hong Kong Retail Management Association
 April 2020 2019-2020 Smiling Enterprise Award 
 September 2021 The Best Mobile Network and The Best 5G Home Broadband Service Awards, e-zone e-Brand Award 2021, e-zone
 December 2021 The Best 5G Mobile Network Operator - Silver Award, The Best 5G Connected Arena (SmarTone 5G LAB) - Gold Award, 2021 Communications Association of Hong Kong's (CAHK) STAR Award Presentation. 
 August 2022 The Best Mobile Network, The Best 5G Home Broadband Service and The Best Mobile Cyber Security Service, e-brand awards 2022, e-zone.
 September 2022 “Excellence in Customer Insights” at the Awards for Marketing Excellence 2022, organized by The Hong Kong Management Association.
 December 2022 The Best 5G Mobile Network Operator - Silver Award, and the Cybersecurity Excellence Award -Silver Award for its "Cyber & Voice Security" service, 2022 Communications Association of Hong Kong's (CAHK) STAR Award Presentation.

Home 5G Broadband Service 
SmarTone was Hong Kong’s first telecom operator to launch Home 5G Broadband service in September 2020, offering 5G ultra-fast speed, simple plug-and-play setup and fibrefree convenience for residential users.

Fibre Broadband Service
SmarTone launched its fibre broadband service for the home and office markets in 2014.

Roaming Data Service
SmarTone provides customers with a range of roaming data services to meet their needs when travelling abroad.  

 Data Roaming Day Pass/Multi-Day Roaming Data Pack
 APAC/ Worldwide Roaming Data Pack
 RoamFlex Data Pass
 Greater Bay Area Easy Pack
 "Upgraded" Roaming Data Day Plan
 Travel prepaid cards

Value-added Services

SmarTone offers different types of value-added services, including: 

 Cyber & Voice Security
 Call Guard
 Data Guard
 Add-On Number 
 “eDoctor” Video Consultation for Family
 Gamergizer
 SmarT Caregiver Service
 SmarT Share
 Music Streaming Platforms ( Apple Music, KKBox, JOOX) 
 Video Streaming Platforms ( hmvod and Netflix) 
 Kono Magazine
 “SmarT Guardian” Service

SmarTone also provides services for its customers, including free power bank rental, phone content transfer, and screen replacement.

Loyalty Programme
SmarTone Plus is SmarTone’s loyalty programme for selected customers to enjoy a range of rewards and experiences, including birthday celebrations, personal consultations, tailored services, and flash surprises, upon subscription of SmarTone’s mobile service.

In December 2022, SmarTone announced a collaboration with The Point, an integrated loyalty program of Sun Hung Kai Properties. SmarTone customers will automatically earn 1 The Point bonus point upon every eligible spending of $2 at SmarTone. Customers can convert their accumulated bonus points and spend them as cash at over 2,000 merchant partners at 25 selected Sun Hung Kai Properties (SHKP) malls across Hong Kong, enjoy free parking and catering privileges, and redeem rewards at a SmarTone-designated page on The Point App.

See also
 List of companies of Hong Kong

References

External links
   
 Official website of SmarTone-Comunicações Móveis  
 Official website of SmarTone Telecommunications Holdings  

Vodafone
Sun Hung Kai Properties
Companies listed on the Hong Kong Stock Exchange
Mobile phone companies of Hong Kong
Companies of Macau
Telecommunications companies established in 1992
Former companies in the Hang Seng Index
Hong Kong brands
Offshore companies of Bermuda
1992 establishments in Hong Kong